Pucheng County is a county in the east of Shaanxi province, China. It is under the administration of the prefecture-level city of Weinan.

Administrative divisions
As 2019, Pucheng County is divided to 2 subdistricts and 15 townships.
Subdistricts
 Fengxian Subdistrict
 Zijing Subdistrict

Towns

Climate

Transport
Pucheng East Railway Station lies on the Xi'an–Yan'an Railway.

References

County-level divisions of Shaanxi
Weinan